The Madison Historic District is a historic district located in Madison, Indiana.  In 2006, it was named a National Historic Landmark due to its unique Midwestern beauty and architecture scheme.  Among the prominent buildings in the district are the Lanier Mansion, one of two buildings separately considered a National Historic Landmark in the district, and the Schofield House, the birthplace of the Grand Lodge of Indiana.  In total, it comprises 133 blocks of Madison, Indiana, overlooking the Ohio River in Jefferson County, Indiana.

Madison's most prominent days were before 1860.  It was a major transportation hub, taking river commerce and shipping it to the inland of Indiana.  Once transportation routes changed, Madison faltered until the tourism industry saved it more than a century later.

Many of the prominent buildings in the district were built by Madison-native-architect Francis Costigan, who favored the Greek Revival style.  Two of these are National Historic Landmarks: the Lanier Mansion, and the Charles L. Shrewsbury House.  The Lanier Mansion was the former home of James Lanier, who lent money to governor Oliver P. Morton to run the Indiana state government to circumvent the legislative process between 1862 and 1865.  The Shrewsbury-Windle House was built for steamboat captain Charles Shrewsbury, who would later become a mayor of Madison.  Costigan, himself, built his home in the district, and it is considered one of the best uses of a narrow lot by modern architects. A thirty-foot parlor is considered the highlight of the House.

Also located in the district is the restored 1895 Railroad Depot and the Jefferson County Historical Society museum. When the Madison & Indianapolis Railroad was first built in 1835, Madison was far bigger than the new state capital of Indianapolis.  The railroad was constructed by Irish laborers.

Broadway Fountain was first displayed at the 1876 Centennial Exposition, and then presented to Madison in 1884. It was manufactured by an iron foundry owned by Adrian Janes, who is also responsible for manufacturing the dome of the U.S. Capitol Building, The fountain was replaced by a reproduction in 1981.

Madison was also a major stop on the Underground Railroad, with many homes in the area having once been used for assisting the escape of slaves.

Gallery

References

Madison, Indiana
National Historic Landmarks in Indiana
National Register of Historic Places in Jefferson County, Indiana
Underground Railroad in Indiana
Historic districts on the National Register of Historic Places in Indiana
Populated places on the Underground Railroad